Omihi or Ōmihi is a rural community in the Hurunui District of the Canterbury Region, on New Zealand's South Island. It is located 21km north-east of Amberley.

Translated from Māori, it means place of (Ō) greeting, wailing or lamentation (mihi).

European settlers began farming the area in the late 19th century.

The Omihi settlement includes a school and a community hall, which is used for a range of functions.

The settlement has a war memorial obelisk, featuring the names of ten local men who died in World War I and five local men who died in World War II.

Demographics

Omihi had a population of 1,242 at the 2018 New Zealand census, an increase of 45 people (3.8%) since the 2013 census, and an increase of 48 people (4.0%) since the 2006 census. There were 486 households. There were 660 males and 579 females, giving a sex ratio of 1.14 males per female. The median age was 45.6 years (compared with 37.4 years nationally), with 231 people (18.6%) aged under 15 years, 162 (13.0%) aged 15 to 29, 639 (51.4%) aged 30 to 64, and 207 (16.7%) aged 65 or older.

Ethnicities were 95.2% European/Pākehā, 8.9% Māori, 0.7% Pacific peoples, 1.0% Asian, and 1.9% other ethnicities (totals add to more than 100% since people could identify with multiple ethnicities).

The proportion of people born overseas was 10.6%, compared with 27.1% nationally.

Although some people objected to giving their religion, 57.7% had no religion, 32.6% were Christian, 0.2% were Hindu, 0.2% were Buddhist and 1.2% had other religions.

Of those at least 15 years old, 162 (16.0%) people had a bachelor or higher degree, and 210 (20.8%) people had no formal qualifications. The median income was $31,000, compared with $31,800 nationally. The employment status of those at least 15 was that 561 (55.5%) people were employed full-time, 189 (18.7%) were part-time, and 18 (1.8%) were unemployed.

Education

The school was founded in 1900 with a roll of 31 and one classroom. The school was expanded between 1906 and 1911, and moved to a new position on the same site in 1948. It currently has two classrooms, an office block, a school house, a library and a swimming pool.

References

Populated places in Canterbury, New Zealand
Hurunui District